Events in the year 1954 in Norway.

Incumbents
 Monarch – Haakon VII
 Prime Minister – Oscar Torp (Labour Party)

Events

 28 March – Bear Island accident: A Royal Norwegian Air Force seaplane crashed on the Bear Island. The plane had a crew of 8 men and one passenger. One of the crew members survived the accident.
 5 April – Crown Princess Martha, wife of Crown Prince Olav dies, age 53.
 3 May – Asbjørn Sunde and Erling Nordby were convicted for treason and espionage in favour of the Soviet Union.
 State-owned Årdal og Sunndal Verk begins construction on the Sunndal plant.

Anniversaries
 100 years since the opening of Norway's first railway line.

Popular culture

Sports
Martin Stokken, cross country skier and athlete, is awarded the Holmenkollen medal, Norway's highest skiing award.
Football Association of Norway joins UEFA.

Music

Film

Literature

Notable births
 
 
 

12 January – Jan-Olav Ingvaldsen, politician (died 2021).
27 January – Leif Holger Larsen, diplomat (died 2015).
29 January – Vera Lysklætt, politician.
8 February – Per Thomas Andersen, literary historian and novelist.
16 February – Viggo Hagstrøm, legal scholar (died 2013).
18 February – Helen Bjørnøy, Lutheran minister and politician.
15 March – Unni Steinsmo, chemical engineer.
17 March – Bjørn Eidsvåg, singer, songwriter and Lutheran minister
25 March – Grete Berget, politician and Minister (died 2017).
3 April – Mille-Marie Treschow, landlord and businessperson (died 2018).
7 April – Geir Myhre, ice hockey player (died 2016).
16 April – Ingun Brechan, sport rower.
26 April – Toril Førland, alpine skier.
28 April – Gunn Berit Gjerde, politician
10 July – Wenche Andersen, chef
18 August – Egil Johansen, orienteering competitor.
28 August – Torgeir Schjerven, author and poet
5 September – Per Knut Aaland, cross country skier
20 September – Arne Blix, journalist
23 September – Idar Lind, novelist, crime fiction writer, songwriter and playwright.
1 October – Tone Pahle, sport rower.
7 October – Kjell Grandhagen, military officer (died 2019).
17 October – Hans Kristian Hogsnes, politician (died 2010).
20 October – Terje Moe Gustavsen, politician (died 2019).
6 November – Karin Fossum, author
15 November – Arne A. Jensen, media and corporate executive (died 2020).
25 November – Kristin Moe, politician
27 November – Elisabeth Berge, businessperson and civil servant (died 2020).
15 December – Kine Hellebust, singer, actress, children's writer, non-fiction writer and playwright.
21 December – Grethe Fossli, politician

Full date unknown
Jan Bugge-Mahrt, diplomat
Bente Haukland Næss, politician
Harald Thon, orienteering competitor (died 2019).

Notable deaths

21 January – Per Reidarson, composer and music critic (born 1879)
31 January – Christian Fredrik Monsen, politician (born 1878)
8 March – Leiv Heggstad, educator, linguist and translator (born 1879).
5 April – Crown Princess Martha, royal (born 1901)
10 April – Oscar Mathisen, speed skater (born 1888)
28 April – Knud Leonard Knudsen, gymnast and Olympic gold-medallist (born 1879)
25 May – Snefrid Eriksmoen, politician (born 1894)
25 May – Albert Helgerud, rifle shooter and Olympic gold medallist (born 1876).
7 June – Sigurd Smebye, gymnast and Olympic bronze medallist (born 1886)
4 July – Wilhelm Blystad, track and field athlete (born 1881)
27 July – Jacob Tullin Thams, Olympian skier (born 1889)
29 July – Knut Johannes Hougen, politician and Minister (born 1854)
14 August – Fredrik Ludvig Konow, politician and Minister (born 1864)

Full date unknown 
 Rasmus Olsen Langeland, politician and Minister (born 1873)
 Per Berg Lund, politician and Minister (born 1878)
 Torjus Værland, politician and Minister (born 1868)

See also

References

External links